Princess Azula is a fictional character in Nickelodeon's animated television series Avatar: The Last Airbender, created by Michael Dante DiMartino and Bryan Konietzko, and voiced by Grey DeLisle.

In the show, Azula is the crown princess of the Fire Nation and an extremely powerful firebending prodigy. Upon Fire Lord Ozai's orders, she begins a quest with her childhood friends Mai and Ty Lee to retrieve her banished brother Prince Zuko and his mentor, their uncle Iroh, while also attempting to capture Avatar Aang, considered the Fire Nation's greatest threat to victory in the war. Azula is known for being a skilled strategist and manipulator. As her brother Zuko states, she "always lies." Throughout the original series and the sequel comics, she is shown to be capable of highly advanced firebending, producing hotter blue flames as well as lightning.

Appearances

Avatar: The Last Airbender television series

Book One: Water
Since she is the shadowed firebender in the series' opening sequence (though she is depicted bending red fire instead of her signature blue), Azula appears at the beginning of every episode of Avatar: The Last Airbender. In the first season, she makes her first appearance in a flashback during 13-year-old Zuko's Agni Kai (firebending duel) against their father, Fire Lord Ozai. Azula smirks as Zuko's face is burned after he refuses to fight Ozai, who takes this as a sign of weakness and disrespect. The Fire Lord then banishes the permanently scarred Zuko and tasks him with finding the long-lost avatar. Azula makes a second brief appearance at the end of the first season when Ozai tasks her with repatriating Zuko and Iroh, who accompanied his nephew into exile and briefly cooperated with the series' protagonists.

Book Two: Earth
After her first attempt to capture Zuko and Iroh is accidentally thwarted by her ship's captain, Azula enlists the help of her childhood friends, Mai and Ty Lee. She eventually encounters the Avatar in Omashu and continues to pursue him, Zuko, and Iroh for the rest of the season. Following her initial failure to enter the Earth Kingdom capital Ba Sing Se using a giant drill to breach the city's strong outer wall, Azula comes in contact with the Kyoshi Warriors, esteemed fighters who, despite their lack of ability to bend any element, dress as and utilize the fighting style of Kyoshi, a past Avatar. Azula, Mai and Ty Lee then proceed to defeat and impersonate them.

Posing as Kyoshi Warriors, Azula and her friends infiltrate Ba Sing Se and befriend Earth King Kuei, who tells them about the planned invasion of the Fire Nation during an upcoming solar eclipse. Azula also comes to understand that the secret police and intelligence agency known as the Dai Li is the key to power in the capital. She is discovered as an infiltrator by Dai Li agents and brought before their imprisoned leader, Long Feng. Having in fact intentionally exposed herself, Azula lulls him into a false sense of control and accepts his offer to help stage a coup d'état against the Earth King and the loyalist Council of Five. Immediately after her seizure of power, Azula betrays Long Feng and assumes permanent leadership of the Dai Li. She also encounters Zuko in the city and convinces him to join her in order to redeem himself. During their showdown, Azula strikes Aang with a bolt of lightning while he is in the Avatar State, though he is later revived by Katara. Azula then orders the Dai Li to tear down the walls of Ba Sing Se, exposing the city to an invasion and occupation by the Fire Nation.

Book Three: Fire
In the early episodes of this season, Azula bonds with her brother and friends after their victorious return to the Fire Nation with Iroh as a prisoner. However, Azula lies to Ozai by claiming that Zuko killed Aang, as she has a hunch that Aang survived and knows that all the blame would now fall on Zuko if this were true. During the two-part episode "The Day of Black Sun," Aang assembles an elite invasion force and attacks the capital, taking advantage of a solar eclipse that renders the firebenders powerless. Having been warned by Azula, Ozai is evacuated to an underground bunker prior to the invasion. Azula and her Dai Li agents stall Aang and his friends Sokka and Toph from finding Ozai before the eclipse, which lasts only eight minutes, allowing the firebenders to retaliate with full force once they regain their bending, causing the invasion to fail. However, Zuko defects to Team Avatar after confronting Ozai during the eclipse.

Later, Azula, accompanied by Mai and Ty Lee, visits The Boiling Rock, the top security Fire Nation prison where Zuko has been captured in an attempt to infiltrate the prison and rescue the captured forces of the failed invasion. However, Zuko, Sokka, Suki (leader of the Kyoshi Warriors, who had been captured in the aftermath of their battle with Azula) and Sokka's father Hakoda manage to escape. Mai betrays Azula by aiding the group's escape, proclaiming that she is doing so out of her love for Zuko. Enraged, Azula attempts to attack Mai but is stopped by Ty Lee, who renders her incapable of bending by blocking her chi (the energy within one which one would use for bending). After having Mai and Ty Lee imprisoned for betraying her, Azula follows Zuko and Sokka's group to the Western Air Temple, where she attempts to kill them. The fight ends in a draw, with Azula narrowly escaping death after falling from one of the airships while the protagonists manage to flee.

In the finale, Ozai leaves Azula behind in the Fire Nation as he sets out to conquer the world, naming her as his successor to the Fire Lord position. Distraught by Mai and Ty Lee's betrayal and confused by the former's defiance of her position, Azula sinks into psychosis, hallucinates about her long-lost mother, and deposes nearly all of her servants and advisers in fear of similar betrayal. Before she is crowned as Fire Lord, Zuko and Katara interrupt the ceremony, whereupon Azula challenges Zuko to single combat in an Agni Kai. However, Azula's attacks, while powerful, are wild and emotional while Zuko's are calm and disciplined; and when his attacks begin to overpower her, she sends a bolt of lightning toward Katara, but ends up striking down Zuko, who attempts to redirect it. She is ultimately defeated by Katara who takes her captive via waterbending, causing Azula to have a complete nervous breakdown.

Avatar: The Last Airbender comic series

The Promise
Following the end of the war, Azula is admitted to a psychiatric institution, where she is closely monitored. One year after the war's end, Zuko visits Azula to request her assistance in gaining information from Ozai on the whereabouts of their long-lost mother Ursa, and Azula accepts without asking for anything in return.

The Search
When Azula visits Ozai in his prison, they are watched by Fire Lord Zuko before she asks him to leave when their father remains silent in her presence. Azula, having learned of the letters Ursa sent which falsely claims that Fire Lord Zuko is not Ozai's biological son, dodges her brother's questions while distracting him with her bending long enough to access the letters and burn them. She uses this as leverage as she convinces Zuko to allow her to join his quest to find Ursa in return for the letters' information, though she intends to use the letters' content to dethrone her brother while also murdering their mother. Her request is granted, and she becomes a protagonist by joining Team Avatar. The team eventually finds that Ursa lost her memory and assumed the identity of Noriko, starting a new family in her home village. Although Azula nearly kills Ursa, she becomes emotionally confused after her mother apologizes for not showing her enough motherly love and even more after Fire Lord Zuko reveals that he still loves his sister, despite their strained relationship. This results in a confused Azula running off into the wilderness. For several weeks, Zuko searches for Azula but fails to find her.

Smoke and Shadow
After several weeks, Azula helps her followers from the mental institution she was held in escape. They resurface under the guise of kemurikage (dark spirits). The "kemurikage" kidnap many children. After Zuko frees the children, Azula tells him that her motivation is to make him more like their father by relying on fear to maintain control. Azula then escapes and is last seen observing Zuko apologizing to his people for his recent actions before leaving. As Azula directly tells Zuko about her supposed intentions and seems to take his speech seriously, she is possibly acting as a stealth mentor by using reverse psychology on Zuko.

In other media
Princess Azula appears in the video games Avatar: The Last Airbender – The Burning Earth and Avatar: The Last Airbender – Into the Inferno again voiced by Grey DeLisle.  Summer Bishil makes a cameo appearance as Azula at the end of live-action adaptation The Last Airbender, when Fire Lord Ozai orders her to defeat the Avatar.  Writer and director M. Night Shyamalan envisioned Azula as the primary antagonist of the unmade sequel to the film.

Conception and creation
Konietzko notes that Azula's design when compared to other main characters "came together relatively quickly." Azula was originally going to wear a heavily phoenix-themed armor, though the idea was eventually abandoned. Azula's blue firebending was meant to symbolize that she was more powerful than Zuko as well as a firebending prodigy, and also to easily distinguish her attacks from his in their fights. She was initially intended to have an arranged marriage during the third season. Both creators hold the character in high regard; Konietzko believes she is "by far the most complex, interesting, and dangerous villain in the series" while DiMartino wrote that she was his favorite villain in the series.

Voice
Azula is voiced by Grey DeLisle. DeLisle recounts that she had studied her "whole life" for well-written characters like Azula who were hard to come by. Overall, DeLisle felt her life had changed positively from the role, and association with the series, relaying this to Janet Varney who would voice Korra in the sequel series.

Characterization
Although Azula's age is never stated in the series itself, the Avatar website, as well as the book The Earth Kingdom Chronicles, gives her age as fourteen. She is Fire Lord Sozin's great-granddaughter through Ozai, and Avatar Roku's through her mother, Ursa. In another flashback, it is revealed that she is named after her paternal grandfather Azulon, Ozai's father. Even as a child, Azula demonstrated her natural talents early in life, along with her tendency for malice and perfectionism. Her sharp wit and the skill she displayed towards Firebending gained her much attention and acclaim, often at Zuko's expense. Even when young, Azula suggests that her father would make a better Fire Lord than the heir apparent, her uncle Iroh, whom she dubbed "a quitter and a loser" for abandoning his siege of the Earth Kingdom's capital Ba Sing Se, which would have secured the Fire Nation's victory in the war, after the death of his son Lu Ten.

Personality
Azula is a firebending prodigy and a dedicated perfectionist. As one who wants nothing less than absolute control, she likewise has remarkable control of herself, seemingly able to react to any situation at a moment's notice without losing her composure. This is shown when she learns of a secret plot to invade the Fire Nation while in disguise but does not react to not blow her cover. Though it's not canonically confirmed, experts speculate that Azula's extremely strong locus of control and her subsequent loss of control was predictive of her later descent into a bout of psychosis.

Psychological analyses estimate Azula as being highly intelligent, and as having Conduct disorder with notable Machiavellian and, at times, sadistic traits. Following the betrayal by her closest friends Mai and Ty Lee, she possibly develops schizoaffective disorder, as indicated by her delusions of persecution, hallucinations of her mother speaking to her, as well as her frequent and radical intermittent mood fluctuations. 

From a young age, Azula had maladaptive traits, showing almost no empathy or remorse for actions that harmed others both physically and emotionally. Azula was heavily influenced by her father, who favored her over Zuko due to her superior firebending abilities. However, Azula's father was a ruthless man incapable of true love. Azula was also constantly scolded by her mother due to her cruel nature. This shaped Azula's fears that she could not count on love from anyone, no matter how close they seemed. Unable to trust others, she instead began to control them using fear.

Although a skilled strategist and capable of predicting her enemies' moves, she is awkward in social situations, and later admits to jealousy of Ty Lee's ability to attract potential sweethearts during "The Beach" episode. She ends up seducing Chan with Ty Lee's advice to act dumb; however, she scares him away when she shows her true personality.

From childhood, Azula believed her mother favored Zuko and thought her monstrous, which she admitted to be true but hurt her deeply. After she was betrayed by Mai and Ty Lee, her mental state gradually collapsed, as her attacks became far more vicious and she was seemingly obsessed with killing Zuko. After her defeat, it is revealed in the graphic novel The Promise that she was admitted into a mental institution in the Fire Nation due to her poor mental state, possibly schizophrenia. Both in the series and the comics, she is shown to be disturbed by frequent hallucinations of her mother.

Azula often acts cold-hearted towards her uncle and her brother, but she appears to show some genuine concern for Zuko in the season 2 finale and early episodes of season 3. Although she seems to care about her friends, she frequently manipulates them, as seen when she threatens Ty Lee into leaving the circus in Book 2. There has been only one known occurrence of Azula showing remorse by apologizing after unintentionally insulting Ty Lee.

Firebending
Azula is highly skilled in firebending, which utilizes Chinese martial arts techniques of Changquan, Shaolinquan, Lóng Xíng Mó Qiáo and Xing Yi Quan. The series' creators consulted a professional martial artist in the design of the show's fighting style. Azula is one of the most skilled firebenders in the show and is a very difficult person to defeat in single combat. Her excellent firebending abilities, hand-to-hand combat skills, intelligence, agility and charisma make her a formidable opponent.

Blue flames

Azula is the only firebender who can produce blue flames, which are hotter and contain more energy (according to Planck's law) than those of other firebenders who bend normal orange flames. Her name is derived from azul, the Spanish, Galician and Portuguese word for blue. However, Azula could not produce blue fire as a young child, as shown in flashbacks. Similarly, her grandfather Azulon was never shown to wield blue flames despite his namesake implying otherwise. Azula can also use her firebending in previously unseen ways, such as jets of flames and whirling disks. She often firebends using only two fingers, rather than a closed fist or open hand common to other firebenders. Azula can fight for long periods of time without tiring. She is also able to generate powerful shields of swirling flames, which she uses to withstand the simultaneous combined attacks of Aang, Katara, Zuko and Toph. She is even able to charge up her fire before releasing it, as was seen during one fight with Aang.

Azula is able to propel herself, using her flames, in a manner similar to a rocket. This ability has also been extended as a means to fly for short periods of time as seen in the Boiling Rock. She can also breathe fire, as shown when she is defeated by Katara and Zuko.

Lightning generation

Azula is capable of lightning generation, one of the rarest types of firebending; Iroh notes that it isn't really possible to teach lightning generation, it's just something particularly powerful firebenders are capable of.

Other skills
Azula is a skilled unarmed fighter and acrobat. In "The Avatar State," she bests Zuko in combat without resorting to firebending, and in "The Day of Black Sun," she avoids the combined forces of Aang, Toph, and Sokka for several minutes without her bending to aid her. In "Appa's Lost Days," when Suki makes a stab attack at Azula with her fan, Azula jumps horizontally and knocks Suki's sword out of her hand and onto a tree. In "The Boiling Rock," Azula is able to fall and land on her hands, holding her body up horizontally, with ease.

Azula is an expert in persuasion. She is capable of using psychological warfare, intimidation, and mistruths to con other people into obeying her. She also has the ability to lie easily without causing any change in her breathing and heart rate, making it nearly impossible to detect if she's lying, which she demonstrates in "The Day of Black Sun." She is also an accomplished strategist, as she is able to conquer Ba Sing Se, a city thought to be impenetrable while usurping the Earth King and hierarchy of the Earth Kingdom capital all in one swift move.

Reception
Critical response to Azula's character has generally been positive. Paste Magazine ranked Azula as the ninth best character from the Avatar universe. Hollywood.com included Azula among the "9 Villains You Should Root For", commenting that Azula "proved to be as cunning and vicious a villain as ever appeared on children's television." She was also the only female animated character to be featured in the list. ComicsAlliance ranked Azula second in the website's "Top 10 Cartoon Bad Guys" list. Ranking the character third for "The Seven Best Animated Female Villains", The Mary Sue wrote, "Gleefully evil and efficient right up until the end. You're a thorny, flaming rose, Azula, and you were fascinating to watch." Moviepilot ranked Azula first in the "Grey Griffin's 6 Greatest Villain Roles" with writer Mara Mullikin describing her "a perfectionist", while also complimenting her "tactful mind, agility, ruthlessness, manipulative nature and fire bending prowess cemented her as probably being the series' best antagonist." The same website ranked her the fifth greatest female villain, writing that Azula is "a fantastic strategist, an excellent manipulator, and perhaps the greatest firebender the world had ever seen." Website Comicbookmovie ranked her the second best animated villains. The character was ranked 11th on Screen Rant's list of hottest superheroes and villains characters.

Family tree

References

External links

 Azula at Nick.com

Animated human characters
Villains in animated television series
Avatar: The Last Airbender characters
Dark Horse Comics characters
Female characters in animated series
Female supervillains
Fictional Changquan practitioners
Fictional characters with electric or magnetic abilities
Fictional characters with fire or heat abilities
Fictional characters with schizophrenia
Fictional child soldiers
Fictional female martial artists
Fictional kidnappers
Fictional lords and ladies
Fictional Lóng Xíng Mó Qiáo practitioners
Fictional military strategists
Fictional princesses
Fictional queens
Fictional Shaolin kung fu practitioners
Fictional war veterans
Fictional women soldiers and warriors
Fictional Xing Yi Quan practitioners
Teenage characters in television
Television characters introduced in 2005
Animated characters introduced in 2005
Fictional characters with personality disorders
Fictional victims of domestic abuse